Lucien Hesse (10 April 1866 – November 1929) was a French architect. He designed synagogues and private residences, some of which are listed as official historical monuments by the French Ministry of Culture.

Early life
Lucien Hesse was born on 10 April 1866 in Paris.

Career
Hesse designed several synagogues, including the one in Bruyères, Vosges in 1902–1903, and the one in Belleville, Paris in 1930. He also designed a Jewish school in Paris, the École Lucien-de-Hirsch. He designed the chapel of the Roussel family in the Neuilly-sur-Seine community cemetery in 1902.

Hesse designed the Villa Torre Clementina in Roquebrune-Cap-Martin for Ernesta Stern in 1904. He designed the hôtel particulier at 10 bis Avenue Élysée-Reclus in Paris for Auguste Rateau. He also designed the third (and current) Château de la Muette for Baron Henri de Rothschild in 1914–1924; it is now the headquarters of the Organisation for Economic Co-operation and Development (OECD).

Hesse became a knight of the Legion of Honour in 1920.

Death and legacy
Hesse died in November 1929. Some of his buildings are now listed as official historical monuments by the French Ministry of Culture.

References

1866 births
1929 deaths
Architects from Paris
19th-century French architects
20th-century French architects
Chevaliers of the Légion d'honneur
Burials at Neuilly-sur-Seine community cemetery